Kunua Rural LLG is a local-level government (LLG) of the Autonomous Region of Bougainville, Papua New Guinea.

References

Local-level governments of the Autonomous Region of Bougainville